
Domínguez ( in Peninsular Spanish or  elsewhere) is a name of Spanish origin, meaning son of Domingo. The surname is usually written without the accent in the Philippines and the United States.

Geographical distribution
As of 2014, 40.7% of all known bearers of the surname Domínguez were residents of Mexico (frequency 1:242), 12.8% of Spain (1:288), 8.5% of Argentina (1:396), 7.7% of the United States (1:3,721), 4.3% of Cuba (1:212), 3.2% of Colombia (1:1,186), 3.0% of Peru (1:831), 2.6% of Venezuela (1:904), 2.6% of Honduras (1:265), 2.4% of Paraguay (1:241), 2.0% of the Dominican Republic (1:412), 2.0% of the Philippines (1:4,049), 1.5% of Panama (1:214), 1.2% of Ecuador (1:1,028), 1.0% of Guatemala (1:1,243) and 1.0% of El Salvador (1:500).

In Spain, the frequency of the surname was higher than national average (1:288) in the following autonomous communities:
 1. Extremadura (1:131)
 2. Galicia (1:136)
 3. Andalusia (1:172)
 4. Canary Islands (1:179)
 5. Castile and León (1:222)
 6. Ceuta (1:284)

In Cuba, the frequency of the surname was higher than national average (1:212) in the following provinces:
 1. Sancti Spíritus Province (1:122)
 2. Matanzas Province (1:133)
 3. Artemisa Province (1:155)
 4. Holguín Province (1:156)
 5. Pinar del Río Province (1:194)

People
 Adolfo Domínguez (born 1950), Spanish fashion designer
 Alberto González Domínguez, Argentine mathematician
 Alejandro Damián Domínguez (born 1981), Argentine football player
 Alejandro Domínguez Coello (died 2005), former chief of police in Nuevo Laredo, Mexico who was assassinated in 2005
 Albino Núñez Domínguez (1901–74), Galician writer and poet
 Alberto Domínguez (1913-1975), Mexican songwriter
 Alfonso Martínez Domínguez (1922–2002), Mexican politician, mayor of Mexico City, 1970–71
 Álvaro Domínguez (disambiguation)
 Carlos Dominguez (disambiguation), multiple people
 Clemente Domínguez y Gómez (1946–2005), Spanish churchman, pope of the Palmarian Catholic Church 
 Cinthya Domínguez (born 1982), Mexican weightlifter
 Delia Domínguez (1931–2022), Chilean poet
 Diego Domínguez (disambiguation)
 Federico Hernán Domínguez (born 1976), Argentine football player
 Francisco Atanasio Domínguez (18th century), Franciscan missionary and explorer in North America
 Francisco Serrano y Domínguez, Duke de la Torre (1810–1885), Spanish marshal and statesman
 Jasson Domínguez (born 2003), Dominican Republic professional baseball player
 Josefa Ortiz de Domínguez (1768–1829), Mexican conspirator
 José Dominguez, Portuguese football player
 Juan Dominguez y Valdez, Texan governor
 Juanjo Domínguez (contemporary), Argentine classical guitarist
 Leinier Domínguez  (born 1983), Cuban chess grandmaster
 Lourdes Domínguez Lino (born 1981), Spanish tennis player
 Mario Domínguez (born 1975), Mexican Champ Car racing driver
 Marta Domínguez (born 1975), Spanish track athlete in the 3000-meter and 5000-meter events
 Matt Dominguez (born 1978), American football player in the Canadian Football League
 Manuel Dominguez (1803–1882) Early-California ranchero holder and politician
 Miguel Domínguez (1756–1830), Mexican official; corregidor of Querétaro
 Michael L. Dominguez, U.S. Department of Defense official
 Nuria Domínguez (born 1974), Spanish rower
 Oralia Domínguez (1925–2013), Mexican mezzo-soprano
 Óscar Domínguez (1906–1957), Spanish surrealist painter
 Ramón A. Domínguez (born 1976), Venezuelan jockey, National Museum of Racing and Hall of Fame inductee (2016)
 Raúl Domínguez (born 1972), Cuban track cyclist
 Ricardo Dominguez, American professor and electronic activist
 Richard Dominguez (born 1960), American comic book artist and illustrator
 Ron Dominguez (contemporary), former vice-president of Walt Disney Attractions
 Rubén Domínguez (1929-2010), Venezuelan tenor
 Sally Dominguez (born 1969), Australian inventor
 Seranthony Domínguez (born 1994), Dominican major league baseball pitcher
 Sophia Dominguez-Heithoff (born 2000), American model and beauty pageant titleholder
 Wade Dominguez (1966–1998) American actor, model and singer
 Yulieth Domínguez, Colombian footballer

Fictional character

 Kristen Forrester Dominguez, fictional character in the American soap opera The Bold and the Beautiful

References

Spanish-language surnames
Surnames of Spanish origin
Patronymic surnames
Surnames from given names

es:Domínguez (desambiguación)